Admiral Sir Desmond Parry Dreyer,  (6 April 1910 – 15 May 2003) was a senior Royal Navy officer who served as Second Sea Lord and Chief of Naval Personnel from 1965 to 1967.

Naval career
Born the second son of Admiral Sir Frederic Charles Dreyer, Desmond Dreyer joined the Royal Navy in 1924. He served in the Second World War at sea and in the Admiralty.

From July 1953 to April 1955, Dreyer commanded the 3rd Destroyer Squadron in the Mediterranean. He was appointed Chief of Staff to the Commander-in-Chief, Mediterranean Fleet in 1955 and was involved in the Suez Crisis in 1956. He went on to be Assistant Chief of the Naval Staff in 1958, Flag Officer (Flotillas) for the Mediterranean Fleet in 1960 and Flag Officer, Air (Home) in 1961. He was appointed Commander-in-Chief, Far East Fleet in 1962: following the Malayan Emergency he co-ordinated Commonwealth naval forces in their successful resistance to Indonesian incursions into the newly formed Malaysia.

Dreyer became Second Sea Lord and Chief of Naval Personnel in 1965. He was also Principal Naval Aide-de-camp to the Queen from 1965 to 1968. His last appointment was as Chief Advisor (Personnel and Logistics) to Denis Healey, the Secretary of State for Defence in 1967: he retired in 1968.

Later life
In retirement, Dreyer became a member of the Prices and Incomes Board and the Armed Forces' Pay Review Board. He was also Deputy Lieutenant of Hampshire. From 1970 to 1971 he was Chairman of the Royal Navy Club of 1765 & 1785 (United 1889).

Family
In 1934, Dreyer married Elisabeth Chilton: they went on to have two sons and a daughter. In 1959, following his first wife's death, he married Majorie Whiteley.

References

|-

|-

|-

1910 births
2003 deaths
British military personnel of the Suez Crisis
Commanders of the Order of the British Empire
Deputy Lieutenants of Hampshire
Knights Grand Cross of the Order of the Bath
Recipients of the Distinguished Service Cross (United Kingdom)
Royal Navy admirals
Royal Navy officers of World War II
People from Warwick